Cameron Dineen (born June 19, 1998) is an American professional ice hockey defenseman for the Bakersfield Condors of the American Hockey League (AHL) as a prospect to the Edmonton Oilers of the National Hockey League (NHL). Dineen was drafted 68th overall by the Arizona Coyotes in the 2016 NHL Entry Draft and made his NHL debut on November 5, 2021, in a 3–1 loss to the Anaheim Ducks.

Early life
Dineen was born on June 19, 1998, in Toms River, New Jersey to parents Melissa and Kevin. Although he is not related to Kevin Dineen, he comes from a hockey playing family. His father played for North's Mariners while his brother competed with the Jersey Shore Whalers. As well, his cousins also played minor hockey while his uncle played for Ocean County College and East Stroudsburg University.

Dineen began ice skating at the age of four with the learn-to-skate program while his father was a member of the Chicago Blackhawks’ program. Following youth hockey, Dineen began playing with the New Jersey Rockets U19 of the Independent Junior Hockey League and Eastern Hockey League. He played prep hockey at Toms River High School North.

Playing career

Amateur
In his final year with the Rockets, Dineen recorded 11 goals and 30 assists for 41 points through 39 games. He was also the Tri-City Storm's first-round pick in the 2014 United States Hockey League (USHL) Draft, and went pointless in three games. As a result of his play with the Rockets, Dineen was named the EHL's Rookie of the Year for 2015 and committed to play collegiate ice hockey with Yale University. Following this, Dineen was signed to an education contract with the North Bay Battalion of the Ontario Hockey League (OHL) on June 11, 2015.

In his rookie season with the Battalion, Dineen recorded 13 goals and 46 assists for 59 points in 68 games. He began the 2015–16 season ranked 117th overall amongst North American skaters by the NHL Central Scouting Bureau but jumped into the top 40 after averaging nearly a point per game. As such, he was named to the 2015–16 OHL All-Rookie Team and named a finalist for the Emms Family Award as OHL Rookie of the Year. During the post-season, he also tallied eight assists in 11 games before being drafted in the third round, 68th overall, by the Arizona Coyotes in the 2016 NHL Entry Draft.

Upon returning to the Battalion, Dineen played in 29 games before suffering a season-ending MCL tear. On January 6, 2018, Dineen was traded to the Sarnia Sting in exchange for Braden Henderson, a 2nd Round Pick in 2019, 4th Round Pick in 2019, 4th Round Pick in 2020, 2nd Round Pick in 2021, 6th Round Pick in 2022, and two conditional draft picks. He finished the season with the Sting, tallying 28 points in 26 games, and was named a finalist for Defenceman of the Year and Most Sportsmanlike Player of the Year.

Professional
On August 2, 2021, Dineen signed a one-year contract extension to remain with the Coyotes organization. He was recalled to the NHL on October 26 and made his NHL debut on November 5, 2021, in a 3–1 loss to the Anaheim Ducks. During his debut, he recorded three shots and one hit in 16:50 of ice time.

On March 2, 2023, the Coyotes traded Dineen along with Nick Bjugstad to the Edmonton Oilers in exchange for a third-round pick in 2023, and prospect Michael Kesselring.

Career statistics

Regular season and playoffs

International

Awards and honors

References

External links
 

1998 births
Living people
American ice hockey defensemen
Arizona Coyotes draft picks
Arizona Coyotes players
Bakersfield Condors players
Ice hockey people from New Jersey
People from Toms River, New Jersey
Sportspeople from Ocean County, New Jersey
North Bay Battalion players
Sarnia Sting players
Toms River High School North alumni
Tri-City Storm players
Tucson Roadrunners players